The Reasons Why is the fourth studio album by the Canadian country music singer Michelle Wright. It was released in Canada on September 1, 1994, on Arista Nashville.

"Try Getting Over You" was later recorded by Daron Norwood on his 1995 album Ready, Willing and Able. "Safe in the Arms of Love" was later released as a single by Martina McBride from her 1995 album Wild Angels.

Track listing
 "One Good Man" (Steve Bogard, Rick Giles) - 3:41
 "Safe in the Arms of Love" (Pat Bunch, Mary Ann Kennedy, Pam Rose) - 3:31
 "We've Tried Everything Else" (Bob DiPiero, Steve Seskin, Pam Tillis) - 3:54
 "Cold Kisses" (Chapin Hartford, Tillis) - 4:08
 "The Reasons Why I'm Gone" (Chuck Cannon, Gary Loyd) - 3:12
 "Try Getting Over You" (Paul Nelson, Craig Wiseman) - 3:57
 "Where Do We Go from Here" (Jill Colucci, Randy Sharp, Michelle Wright) - 3:54
 "Tell Me More" (Chuck Jones, Cactus Moser) - 3:00
 "The Wall" (Bogard, Giles) - 3:30
 "The Old Song and Dance" (Layng Martine, Jr., Kent Robbins) - 3:33

Personnel

 Richard Bennett – Fender Rhodes, electric guitar
 Stephanie Bentley – background vocals
 Michael Black – background vocals
 Mark Casstevens – acoustic guitar, mandolin
 Joe Chemay – bass guitar
 John Cowan – background vocals
 Bill Cuomo – piano
 Dan Dugmore – pedal steel guitar
 Paul Franklin – dobro, pedal steel guitar, lap steel guitar
 Sonny Garrish – dobro, pedal steel guitar
 Rob Hajacos – fiddle
 Tony Harrell – keyboards
 Dann Huff – electric guitar
 Paul Leim – drums, percussion
 Raul Malo – background vocals
 Liana Manis – background vocals
 Brent Mason – electric guitar
 Steve Nathan – keyboards, piano
 Michael Omartian – piano
 John Wesley Ryles – background vocals
 Cindy Walker – background vocals
 Biff Watson – acoustic guitar
 Lari White – background vocals
 John Willis - guitar
 Lonnie Wilson – drums
 Glenn Worf – bass guitar 
 Michelle Wright – lead vocals

Chart performance

Michelle Wright albums
1994 albums
Albums produced by Val Garay
Arista Records albums